St Albans Cathedral is an Anglican church on Schoeman Street in downtown Pretoria, South Africa. The current cathedral is an extension of an Anglican church built on the property in 1879, which was converted into a cathedral in 1909. The church is named after Saint Alban, the first Christian martyr of Britain.

The cathedral features a metal cross in honor of Prince Christian Victor of Schleswig-Holstein, who died of dysentery during the Second Boer War.

References 

Anglican cathedrals in South Africa
Churches completed in 1879
Churches in Pretoria
Deans of Pretoria
19th-century religious buildings and structures in South Africa